Dalia Allam (born September 17, 1980) is a synchronized swimmer, she represented Egypt at women's duet event in synchronized swimming at the 2004 Summer Olympics in Athena.

Olympic participation

Athena 2004

References 

1980 births
Egyptian synchronized swimmers
Olympic synchronized swimmers of Egypt
Synchronized swimmers at the 2004 Summer Olympics
20th-century Egyptian people
Living people